Birmingham Bulls may refer to:
 Birmingham Bulls (WHA), a defunct ice hockey team from the World Hockey Association and Central Hockey League
 Birmingham Bulls (ACHL), a defunct ice hockey team from the Atlantic Coast Hockey League
 Birmingham Bulls (SPHL), an American ice hockey team in the Southern Professional Hockey League
 Birmingham Bulls (ECHL), a defunct American ice hockey team from the East Coast Hockey League
 Birmingham Bulls (American football), a British American football team
 Birmingham Bulldogs or Birmingham Bulls, a British rugby league team